In Greek mythology, Ilus (Ancient Greek: Ἶλος Ilos) was the founder of the city called Ilios or Ilion (Latinized as Ilium) to which he gave his name. When the latter became the chief city of the Trojan people it was also often called Troy, the name by which it is best known today. In some accounts, Ilus was described to have a plume of horsehair.

Family 
Ilus was son and heir to King Tros of Dardania and Callirhoe, naiad daughter of the river-god Scamander or Acallaris, daughter of Eumedes. He was the brother of Assaracus, Ganymede, Cleopatra and possibly, Cleomestra.

Ilus was the father of Laomedon by his wife, named either Eurydice (daughter of Adrastus), Leucippe or Batia, daughter of Teucer. Other children of Ilus include two daughters, Themiste (or Themis) and Telecleia, who married Capys and Cisseus, respectively. In some accounts, Ilus was the father of Tithonus and Ganymede.

Mythology

Foundation of Ilium 
During his youth, Ilus went to Phrygia and taking part in games that at the time were held by the local king, he won victory in a wrestling match. As a prize he received fifty youths and as many maidens; and the king, on the advice of an oracle, gave him also a dappled cow and asked him to found a city wherever the cow should lie down. This took place when the cow came to the hill of Atë, and in that spot Ilus built the city which he called Ilium.

Palladium 
Then Ilus prayed to Zeus that a sign might be shown to him, and at once he saw the Palladium fallen from heaven and lying before his tent. This wooden statue was three cubits high, its feet joined together; in its right hand it held a spear aloft, and in the other hand a distaff and spindle. But Ilus was immediately blinded, since the Palladium was not to be looked upon by any man. Later on, when he had made offerings to the goddess Athena, he recovered his sight. Grateful for this sign, Ilus decided to give this image a place of honor in the temple as a clear sign of Zeus's consent to the construction of the city. This is how Ilus first laid foundations to the city that would later become famous under the name Troy.

According to Dictys Cretensis, the image fell from heaven at the time when Ilus was building the temple of Athena; the structure was nearly completed, but the roof was not yet on, so the Palladium dropped straight into its proper place in the sacred edifice. Clement of Alexandria mentioned a strange opinion that the Palladium "was made out of the bones of Pelops, just as the Olympian (image of Zeus was made) out of other bones of an Indian beast," that is, out of ivory.

Reign 
Ilus preferred his new city of Ilium to Dardania and on his father's death he remained there, bestowing the rule of Dardania on his brother Assaracus instead, and so the Trojans were split into two kingdoms. After his death, his son Laomedon succeeded him on the throne and became the king of Troy.

As a godly man, Ilus was terribly annoyed by the misconduct of Tantalus and expelled him from Paphlagonia, after Tantalus had incurred the enmity of the gods. Because of this action, Pelops later on advanced to Lydia and there a violent battle between Ilus and Pelops. But Ilus managed to win the victory with great odds and chased Pelops out of the country.

In some myths, Ilus defeated in battle the king of the Bebrykes, named Byzos, and raised Ilion up greatly.

Death 
After the death of Ilus, the Trojans built a large burial mound for him in front of the gates of his city.

Genealogy

Notes

References 

 Apollodorus, The Library with an English Translation by Sir James George Frazer, F.B.A., F.R.S. in 2 Volumes, Cambridge, MA, Harvard University Press; London, William Heinemann Ltd. 1921. ISBN 0-674-99135-4. Online version at the Perseus Digital Library. Greek text available from the same website.
Conon, Fifty Narrations, surviving as one-paragraph summaries in the Bibliotheca (Library) of Photius, Patriarch of Constantinople translated from the Greek by Brady Kiesling. Online version at the Topos Text Project.
 Dictys Cretensis, from The Trojan War. The Chronicles of Dictys of Crete and Dares the Phrygian translated by Richard McIlwaine Frazer, Jr. (1931-). Indiana University Press. 1966. Online version at the Topos Text Project.
 Diodorus Siculus, The Library of History translated by Charles Henry Oldfather. Twelve volumes. Loeb Classical Library. Cambridge, Massachusetts: Harvard University Press; London: William Heinemann, Ltd. 1989. Vol. 3. Books 4.59–8. Online version at Bill Thayer's Web Site
 Diodorus Siculus, Bibliotheca Historica. Vol 1-2. Immanel Bekker. Ludwig Dindorf. Friedrich Vogel. in aedibus B. G. Teubneri. Leipzig. 1888-1890. Greek text available at the Perseus Digital Library.
 Dionysus of Halicarnassus, Roman Antiquities. English translation by Earnest Cary in the Loeb Classical Library, 7 volumes. Harvard University Press, 1937-1950. Online version at Bill Thayer's Web Site
 Dionysius of Halicarnassus, Antiquitatum Romanarum quae supersunt, Vol I-IV. . Karl Jacoby. In Aedibus B.G. Teubneri. Leipzig. 1885. Greek text available at the Perseus Digital Library.
 Gaius Julius Hyginus, Fabulae from The Myths of Hyginus translated and edited by Mary Grant. University of Kansas Publications in Humanistic Studies. Online version at the Topos Text Project.
 Gaius Valerius Flaccus, Argonautica translated by Mozley, J H. Loeb Classical Library Volume 286. Cambridge, MA, Harvard University Press; London, William Heinemann Ltd. 1928. Online version at theio.com.
 Gaius Valerius Flaccus, Argonauticon. Otto Kramer. Leipzig. Teubner. 1913. Latin text available at the Perseus Digital Library.
 Lucius Mestrius Plutarchus, Moralia Translated from the Greek by several hands. Corrected and revised by. William W. Goodwin, PH. D. Boston. Little, Brown, and Company. Cambridge. Press Of John Wilson and son. 1874. 5. Online version at the Perseus Digital Library. Greek text available from the same website.
 Plutarch. Plutarch's Morals.
 Pausanias, Description of Greece with an English Translation by W.H.S. Jones, Litt.D., and H.A. Ormerod, M.A., in 4 Volumes. Cambridge, MA, Harvard University Press; London, William Heinemann Ltd. 1918. . Online version at the Perseus Digital Library
Pausanias, Graeciae Descriptio. 3 vols. Leipzig, Teubner. 1903.  Greek text available at the Perseus Digital Library.
 Publius Ovidius Naso, Fasti translated by James G. Frazer. Online version at the Topos Text Project.
 Publius Ovidius Naso, Fasti. Sir James George Frazer. London; Cambridge, MA. William Heinemann Ltd.; Harvard University Press. 1933. Latin text available at the Perseus Digital Library.
 Publius Ovidius Naso, Metamorphoses translated by Brookes More (1859-1942). Boston, Cornhill Publishing Co. 1922. Online version at the Perseus Digital Library.
 Publius Ovidius Naso, Metamorphoses. Hugo Magnus. Gotha (Germany). Friedr. Andr. Perthes. 1892. Latin text available at the Perseus Digital Library.
 Publius Vergilius Maro, Aeneid. Theodore C. Williams. trans. Boston. Houghton Mifflin Co. 1910. Online version at the Perseus Digital Library.
 Publius Vergilius Maro, Bucolics, Aeneid, and Georgics. J. B. Greenough. Boston. Ginn & Co. 1900. Latin text available at the Perseus Digital Library.
 Quintus Smyrnaeus, The Fall of Troy translated by Way. A. S. Loeb Classical Library Volume 19. London: William Heinemann, 1913. Online version at theio.com
 Quintus Smyrnaeus, The Fall of Troy. Arthur S. Way. London: William Heinemann; New York: G.P. Putnam's Sons. 1913. Greek text available at the Perseus Digital Library.

Mythological city founders
Princes in Greek mythology
Mythological kings of Troy
Kings in Greek mythology
Trojans
Mythological blind people